The Col de Peyresourde (elevation ) is a mountain pass in the central Pyrenees on the border of the department of Haute-Garonne and Hautes-Pyrénées in France. It is situated on the D618 road between Bagnères-de-Luchon and Arreau.

Details of climb
The steepest sections are 9.8%. No mountain pass cycling milestones for cyclists are placed on this side of the climb. Only close to Bagnères-de-Luchon and 3 kilometres from the summit signposts inform about the overall climb.

On this side mountain pass cycling milestones for cyclists are placed every kilometre. They indicate the current height, the distance to the summit, and the average slope in the following passage.

Tour de France
The Col de Peyresourde was first used in the Tour de France in 1910 and has appeared frequently since. The leader over the summit in 1910 was Octave Lapize.

In 2007, the Tour de France crossed the Col de Peyresourde on stage 15, joining the climb at Saint-Aventin (5.5 km from Bagnères de Luchon) after descending from the Port de Balès. This stage was selected for the 2007 L'Étape du Tour, in which amateur and club riders ride over a full stage of the tour.

The col was crossed twice in the 2012 Tour de France, firstly on  Stage 16
from  Pau to Bagnères-de-Luchon, when it was ranked a Category 1 climb,  and again on the following day, when it was unranked, with the stage continuing on to the ski station at nearby Peyragudes.  It was used again in the 2016 Tour de France on  Stage 8, from Pau to Bagnères-de-Luchon, which saw eventual race winner Chris Froome make a daring descent attack from the top of the Col that caught many of his main rivals off guard, resulting in a solo stage victory.

Appearances in Tour de France (since 1947)

References

External links

Complete list of leaders over summit 
Col de Peyresourde on Google Maps (Tour de France classic climbs)

Mountain passes of Haute-Garonne
Mountain passes of Hautes-Pyrénées
Mountain passes of the Pyrenees
Climbs in cycle racing in France
Occitanie region articles needing translation from French Wikipedia